Robert Owen Wood  (July 9, 1930 – November 11, 2007) was a Canadian professional ice hockey defenceman who played in one National Hockey League game for the New York Rangers during the 1950–51. He played on March 25, 1951 against the Chicago Black Hawks. Wood later played two seasons in Great Britain.

Career statistics

Regular season and playoffs

See also
List of players who played only one game in the NHL

External links

1930 births
2007 deaths
Brighton Tigers players
Canadian ice hockey defencemen
New York Rangers players
New York Rovers players
Ice hockey people from Alberta
Sportspeople from Lethbridge
St. Catharines Falcons (OHA) players